Sergei Trubetskoy may refer to:

 Sergei Petrovich Troubetzkoy (1790–1860), Decembrist leader 
 Sergei Nikolaevich Trubetskoy (1863–1905), Russian philosopher

See also 
 Trubetskoy